José Manuel Ruiz Reyes (born 16 July 1978) is a class 10 table tennis player from Spain. He competed at six consecutive Paralympics from 1996 to 2016 and won one individual and four team medals. In 2013, he was awarded the bronze Real Orden al Mérito Deportivo.

References

External links 
  (1996–2008)
  (2012–2016)
 

1978 births
Living people
Spanish male table tennis players
Paralympic table tennis players of Spain
Paralympic silver medalists for Spain
Paralympic bronze medalists for Spain
Paralympic medalists in table tennis
Table tennis players at the 1996 Summer Paralympics
Table tennis players at the 2000 Summer Paralympics
Table tennis players at the 2004 Summer Paralympics
Table tennis players at the 2008 Summer Paralympics
Table tennis players at the 2012 Summer Paralympics
Table tennis players at the 2016 Summer Paralympics
Medalists at the 2000 Summer Paralympics
Medalists at the 2008 Summer Paralympics
Medalists at the 2012 Summer Paralympics
Medalists at the 2016 Summer Paralympics
Sportspeople from Granada
Table tennis players at the 2020 Summer Paralympics